Jeanne d'Auvergne, also Joanna or Joan of Auvergne, is the name of:

 Joanna I, Countess of Auvergne  (1326–1360), Queen Consort of France  
 Joan II, Countess of Auvergne (1378–c. 1424), Duchesse de Berri
 Jeanne, Dauphine d'Auvergne (1414–1436), wife of Louis I, Count of Montpensier